John Lee Armstrong (December 15, 1932 – November 1, 2012) was an American football player and coach.  He was a college football player at Howard College—now known as Samford University—in Homewood, Alabama from 1950 to 1953. Armstrong returned to his alma mater to serve as head football coach from 1966 to 1968, compiling a record of 20–9–2.

Head coaching record

College

References

1932 births
2012 deaths
Samford Bulldogs football coaches
Samford Bulldogs football players
High school football coaches in Alabama
People from Etowah County, Alabama
Coaches of American football from Alabama
Players of American football from Alabama